Roberta Leah Jacobs Gellis (27 September 1927 – 6 May 2016) was an American writer of historical fiction, historical romance, and fantasy. She held master's degrees in both biochemistry and medieval literature.

Many major writers of historical romance cite her as an important influence. She has collaborated with Mercedes Lackey on historical-fantasy fiction.

Early life and education

Roberta was born September 27, 1927 to Margaret Segall Jacobs and Morris B. Jacobs. Gellis grew up in Brooklyn.

She earned a B.A. in chemistry and English in 1947 at Hunter College, and masters degrees in biochemistry and medieval literature. Gellis worked in New York City as a research chemist for about a decade before becoming a writer.

Writing career 

After leaving her research lab job when her son was born, Gellis wrote her first novels, Bond of Blood and Knight's Honor, in the 1960s. She went on to write more than fifty novels. These included more than twenty historical romances, including the Roselynde Chronicles and the Heiress Series, medieval murder mysteries, historical fantasies, space opera, and a mystery featuring Lucrezia Borgia as an amateur detective. Her pseudonyms included Max Daniels, Priscilla Hamilton, and Leah Jacobs. In 1981, the publisher of Romantic Times named Gellis as one of the most popular historical romance authors.

Personal life and death 

She married Charles Gellis on April 14, 1946, and they had one son. Gellis died on May 6, 2016, in Michigan and is buried at Great Lakes National Cemetery in Holly, MI.

Awards 
Best Series Writer of 1983, Romantic Times
1984 Porgie Gold Medal for best historical romance, West Coast Review of Books
1986 Romance Writers of America Lifetime Achievement Award

Books

Pseudonymous books

Gellis wrote books published under at least three pseudonyms.
 The Psychiatrist's Wife (1966), as Leah Jacobs 
 Space Guardian (1977), as Max Daniels
 Offworld (1979), as Max Daniels
 The Love Token (1979), as Priscilla Hamilton

Fantasy and science fiction
 Offworld
 The Space Guardian
 Irish Magic (contributor)
 Irish Magic II (contributor)
 Overstars Mail

Greek mythology
 Dazzling Brightness
 Shimmering Splendor
 Enchanted Fire
 Bull God
 Thrice Bound

Medieval books
 Knight's Honor
 Bond of Blood
 The Dragon and the Rose
 The Sword and the Swan
 The Rope Dancer
 Masques of Gold

The Royal Dynasty series
 Siren Song
 Winter Song
 Fire Song
 A Silver Mirror

The Roselynde Chronicles
 Roselynde
 Alinor
 Joanna
 Gilliane
 Rhiannon
 Sybelle
 Desiree

Tales of Jernaeve
 Tapestry of Dreams
 Fires of Winter

Napoleonic era
 The English Heiress
 The Cornish Heiress
 The Kent Heiress
 Fortune's Bride
 A Woman's Estate

Gellis and Mercedes Lackey

Gellis and Mercedes Lackey wrote four prequels in the Baen Books series "Serrated Edge", whose first four novels Lackey co-wrote with others from 1992 to 1994. These are Gellis's works most widely held in WorldCat libraries.
 This Scepter'd Isle (2004)
 Ill Met by Moonlight (2005)
 By Slanderous Tongues (2007)
 And Less Than Kind (2008)

Mysteries

Magdalene la Bâtarde series
Historical mysteries featuring 12th-century madam-turned-amateur detective Magdalene la Bâtarde:
 A Mortal Bane (1999)
 A Personal Devil (2001)
 Bone of Contention (2002)
 Chains of Folly (2006)

Other
Featuring Lucrezia Borgia:
 Lucrezia Borgia and the Mother of Poisons (2003)

Other
 A Delicate Balance
 Sing Witch, Sing Death

References

External links
 
 

1927 births
2016 deaths
20th-century American novelists
21st-century American novelists
American fantasy writers
American romantic fiction writers
American women novelists
Writers of historical mysteries
Women science fiction and fantasy writers
Women romantic fiction writers
Women mystery writers
20th-century American women writers
21st-century American women writers
Writers of historical fiction set in the Middle Ages
Women historical novelists